Panwarwala پنوار والا is a village in the Punjab of Pakistan. The famous personality of this village is Haji Sardar Mohammad Panwar. It is located at 30°59'40N 70°53'0E with an altitude of 136 metres (449 feet).

References

Villages in Punjab, Pakistan